Nonsectarian institutions are secular institutions or other organizations not affiliated with or restricted to a particular religious group.

Academic sphere

Examples of US universities that identify themselves as being nonsectarian include Adelphi University, Berea College, Boston University, Bradley University, Brandeis University, Columbia College in Missouri, Concordia University in Montréal, Canada, Cornell University, Dalhousie University in Halifax, Nova Scotia, Canada, Denison University, Duke University, Elon University, Fairleigh Dickinson University, Franklin & Marshall College, George Washington University, Hawaii Pacific University, Hillsdale College, Hofstra University, Howard University, Ithaca College, Long Island University, National University, New York University, Northwestern University, Ohio Wesleyan University, Pratt Institute, Quinnipiac University in Connecticut, Reed College in Oregon, Whitman College in Washington, Rice University, the University of Richmond, Syracuse University, Tulane University, the University of Chicago, the University of Denver, the University of Southern California, Vanderbilt University, the Washington University in St. Louis, and Woodbury University in California.

Private primary and secondary schools in the US that self-identify as being nonsectarian include Allendale Columbia School in Rochester, New York, Baylor School in Chattanooga, Tennessee, Columbia Grammar & Preparatory School in New York, Germantown Academy in Fort Washington, Pennsylvania (the oldest nonsectarian school in the U.S.), Pine Crest School in Ft. Lauderdale, Florida, and The Pembroke Hill School.

Pi Lambda Phi ( or Pi Lam) is a college social fraternity founded by Frederick Manfred Werner, Louis Samter Levy, and Henry Mark Fisher at Yale University in 1895. It was founded as the first non-sectarian fraternity, "a fraternity in which all men were brothers, no matter what their religion; a fraternity in which ability, open-mindedness, farsightedness, and a progressive, forward-looking attitude would be recognized as the basic attributes." It currently boasts 35 chapters and four colonies in the United States and one chapter in Canada. The fraternity founded the Pi Lambda Phi Fraternity Educational Foundation

The first nonsectarian sorority was Phi Sigma Sigma. Phi Sigma Sigma, colloquially known as "Phi Sig," was the first collegiate nonsectarian sorority, welcoming women of all faiths and backgrounds. Founded by 10 women on November 26, 1913 at Hunter College in New York, Phi Sigma Sigma is now an international sorority with 60,000 initiated members, 115 collegiate chapters and more than 100 alumnae chapters, clubs and associations across the United States and Canada.

Delta Phi Epsilon sorority, founded in 1917, was the first nonsectarian social sorority founded at a professional school.

Legal usage
A 1956 amendment to the constitution of the State of Virginia allowed for tuition grants to be paid by the state to nonsectarian private schools.

Blaine amendments to thirty-eight state constitutions forbid direct government aid to educational institutions that have a religious affiliation. The typical wording, "religious sects or denominations," is most often used to challenge support to Catholic parochial schools (38% of private school attendance); Protestant schools with an undifferentiated "Christian," often get a pass. These schools often claim both "nonsectarian" and "Christian" in their promotional materials. The United States Department of Education differentiates Christian from Conservative Christian in its analyses.

Non-academic institutions

Organizations that are explicitly nonsectarian include the Apex Clubs of Australia, those participating in the Ethical Culture Movement, International Society for Krishna Consciousness, the National Jewish Medical and Research Center, and the Tibetan Buddhist Center of Philadelphia. In Northern Ireland, nonsectarian refers to groups identifying themselves as neither Republican or Unionist, such as the Alliance Party of Northern Ireland, Green Party Northern Ireland, People Before Profit or the Police Service of Northern Ireland.

See also
Secularism
Secularity

References

Education policy
Pluralism (philosophy)
Political philosophy